Baba Kandi Rud (also Romanized as Bābā Kandī Rūd; also known as Bābā Kandī) is a village in Qaranqu Rural District, in the Central District of Hashtrud County, East Azerbaijan Province, Iran. At the 2006 census, its population was 646, in 149 families.

References 

Towns and villages in Hashtrud County